Daniel or Dan Levy may refer to:

In the arts
Daniel Levy (pianist) (born 1947), Argentine classical pianist, author and broadcaster
Dan Levy (Canadian actor) (born 1983), Canadian actor and television personality
Dan Levy (American comedian) (born 1981), American comedian

In politics
Sir Daniel Levy (politician) (1872–1937), Australian lawyer and politician

In science
Daniel Levy (sociologist) (born 1962), German-American sociology professor, specialist in memory studies
Daniel Levy (physician), American cardiologist

In sports
Daniel Levy (basketball) (1930–2020), Israeli Olympic basketball player
Daniel Levy (businessman) (born 1962), Chairman of the British football club Tottenham Hotspur
Dan Levy (journalist) (born 1978),  American sports journalist

See also
Dani Levy (born 1957), Swiss filmmaker, theatrical director and actor
Daniel Levey (c. 1875–?), infamous swindler in the early 20th century
Daniel Lévi (1961–2022), French singer-songwriter